YC or yC may refer to:

Arts and entertainment 
 Yellowcard, an American pop-rock band
 Yellow Claw (DJs), Dutch DJ duo
 Yung Chris, rapper
 Yury G. Chernavsky (born 1947), a Russian-American producer, composer and songwriter

Businesses and organizations 
 Y Combinator, a seed-stage startup funding firm
 Yale College, the liberal arts college of Yale University
 Youth Conference (Christian), an annual Christian conference
 Youth Conference (Hong Kong), a youth conference in Hong Kong

Places 
 Yakima County, Washington
 Yellowstone Club, a private ski community in Big Sky, Montana, US
 Yuba City, California

Science and technology 
 S-Video (Y/C), a signaling standard for standard definition video
 Yottacoulomb, an SI unit of electric charge
 Yoctocoulomb, another SI unit of electric charge

Military 
 YC, the United States Navy hull classification symbol for «open lighter»